Pismis 20 is a compact open cluster in Circinus. It is located at the heart of the Circinus OB1 association in the Norma arm of the Milky Way Galaxy. HD 134959, a blue supergiant variable star also called CX Circinus, is the brightest star in Pismis 20.

References 

Open clusters
Circinus (constellation)
Star-forming regions